Prof. Andrzej Paczkowski (born 1 October 1938 in Krasnystaw) is a Polish historian. Professor of Collegium Civitas, director of Modern History Studies in the Political Institute of Polish Academy of Sciences, member of Collegium of Institute of National Remembrance.

In 1960 he finished studies at the history department of the University of Warsaw. In 1966 Paczkowski defended his doctorate thesis, and was habilitated in 1975. In 1990 he was given the professor degree.

In 1974-1995 (for 7 terms) he was a president of the Polish Mountaineering Association (Polski Związek Alpinizmu).

Works
 Prasa polonijna w latach 1870-1939: zarys problematyki (1977)
 Prasa i społeczność polska we Francji w latach 1920-1940 (Press and the Polish Community in France 1920-1940) (1979)
 Prasa polska w latach 1918-1939 (Polish Press 1918-1939) (1980)
 Stanisław Mikołajczyk 1901-1966. Zarys biografii politycznej (1991)
 Pół wieku dziejów Polski 1939-1989 (Half Century of the History of Poland 1939-1989) (2000)
 Od sfałszowanego zwycięstwa do prawdziwej klęski: szkice do portretu PRL (1999)
 Droga do "mniejszego zła": strategia i taktyka obozu władzy; lipiec 1980 - styczeń 1982 (2001)
 Strajki, bunty, manifestacje jako "polska droga" przez socjalizm (Strikes, Revolts, Manifestations as the "Polish Way" through Socialism) (2003)
 Wojna polsko-jaruzelska (2006)
 Trzy twarze Józefa Światły: przyczynek do historii komunizmu w Polsce (2009)

External links 

 

1938 births
Living people
20th-century Polish historians
Polish male non-fiction writers
University of Warsaw alumni
Historians of Poland
Knights of the Order of Polonia Restituta
Officers of the Order of Polonia Restituta
Recipients of the Silver Cross of Merit (Poland)
Recipients of the Silver Medal for Merit to Culture – Gloria Artis
Collaborators of the Polish Biographical Dictionary
People from Krasnystaw
People associated with the magazine "Kultura"